is a city located in Tochigi Prefecture, Japan. ,  the city had an estimated population of 117,669, in 52,066 households  and a population density of 330 persons per km2. The city is known for its Outlet Mall, Sano Yakuyoke Daishi Temple, and its local variety of ramen, Sano Ramen. More recently, Sano has gained international recognition for being the home of cricket in Japan.

Geography
Sano is located in the northern Kantō plain, in southwestern Tochigi Prefecture, bordered by Gunma Prefecture to the west. The location river boundary connected by Tochigi.

Surrounding municipalities
Tochigi Prefecture
 Ashikaga
 Kanuma
 Tochigi
Gunma Prefecture
 Tatebayashi
 Midori
 Kiryū
 Itakura

Climate
Sano has a Humid subtropical climate (Köppen Cfa) characterized by warm summers and cold winters with heavy snowfall.

Demographics
Per Japanese census data, the population of Sano peaked around 1990 and has declined since.

History
During the Edo period, Sano was a castle town and the seat of the daimyō of Sano Domain. Following the Meiji Restoration, the town of Sano was created within Aso District, Tochigi with the establishment of the modern municipalities system on April 1, 1889.Sano was elevated to city status on April 1, 1943, when it merged with the neighboring towns of Inubushi and Horigome and the villages of Sakai and Hatagawa. The city annexed the village of Inazuma (from Ashikaga District) on January 1, 1955, followed by  the town of Akami(from Aso District) on April 1, 1955.

On February 28, 2005, Sano absorbed the towns of Kuzu and Tanuma (both from Aso District).

Government
Sano has a mayor-council form of government with a directly elected mayor and a unicameral city legislature of 26 members. Sano contributes three members to the Tochigi Prefectural Assembly. In terms of national politics, the city is part of Tochigi 5th district of the lower house of the Diet of Japan.

Economy
Agriculture and light manufacturing are mainstays of the local economy, with production of Kanpyō, turmeric and spinach being prominent local crops. The city is increasingly a commuter town for neighboring Utsunomiya.

Education
Sano College
 Sano also has 26 public primary schools and 11 public middle schools operated by the city government. The city has three public high schools operated by the Tochigi Prefectural Board of Education. The prefecture also operates one middle school. There is also three private high schools.

Sports 
Sano has become the headquarter of the Japan Cricket Association and has hosted a number of cricket matches between international teams. On 22 March 2016, it was announced that Sano would be home to the Sano International Cricket Ground, which will become Japan's first dedicated cricketing venue built for purpose which no longer has to compete with other sports for usage.

Transportation

Railway
 JR East – Ryōmō Line
 
 Tōbu Railway – Tōbu Sano Line
 -  -  -  -  -  -  -

Highway
  – Sano-Fujioka Interchange, Sano Service Area and Smart Interchange
  – Izuruhara Parking Area, Sano-Tanuma Interchange

Bus
Sano Shintoshi Bus Terminal

Local attractions
house of Shōzō Tanaka
site of Sano Castle

International relations
  Lancaster, Pennsylvania, United States
  Quzhou, China, friendship city since 1997

Noted people from Sano
Shōzō Tanaka, politician, social activist
Takuro Ishii, professional baseball player
Tatsuya Ozeki, professional baseball player
Shunsuke Ishikawa, professional baseball player
Kyogo Kawaguchi, singer-songwriter

References

External links

Official Website 

Cities in Tochigi Prefecture
Sano, Tochigi